Servitia is a genus of fungi in the family Verrucariaceae. A monotypic genus, it contains the single species Servitia inconspicuum . It was circumscribed in Alstrup & Hansen, Graphis Scripta vol.12 (2) on page 41 in 2001.

The genus name of Servitia is in honour of Miroslav Servít (1886–1959), who was a Czech teacher, botanist (Bryology, Mykology and Lichenology), who taught at various agricultural Research stations and schools.

References

External links
Index Fungorum

Verrucariales
Lichen genera
Monotypic Ascomycota genera
Taxa described in 2001